Asterosteus is genus of rhenanid placoderm from the Eifelian.  The type species, A. stenocephalus, is known from an incomplete skull from Middle Devonian strata of Ohio.  What may be a second species ("Asterosteus sp Schmidtt 1963") is described from fragments decorated with star-shaped tubercules from the Eifelian-aged Gebze beds of Turkey.

References

Rhenanida
Placoderms of North America
Placoderms of Asia
Placoderm genera
Paleontology in Ohio
Eifelian life